Johnny Duhan (born 30 March 1950) started his career as the fifteen-year-old front man of the Irish beat group Granny’s Intentions. After achieving some success in Limerick and Dublin, the band moved to London and were signed to the Deram record label, releasing several singles and one album, Honest Injun.  However, the band disbanded before Duhan was twenty one and Duhan left the popular music industry and started writing folk songs, poetry and prose. His various works over 40 years have been condensed into  albums: Just Another Town, To The Light, The Voyage and Flame. These correspond with the four chapters of his lyrical autobiography, To The Light.  His songs have been performed by Christy Moore, The Dubliners, Mary Black and many other Irish and international singers. Christy Moore stated that "The Voyage" (Duhan's most popular song according to iTunes) has been performed at over a million weddings worldwide.

Discography
Flame (1996)
Tree (2002)
The Voyage (2005)
Just Another Town (2007)
To The Light (2008)
The Burning Word (2010)
Winter (2012)
Highlights (2014)
Creation (2015)

Books

There is a Time  (Brandon Books, 2001) 
The Voyage - Johnny Duhan Songbook (Waltons Publishers, 2003) 
To The Light (Bell Productions, 2009)

References

External links
Johnny Duhan's Official Website
Johnny Duhan on Irish Rock.org

More on Granny's Intentions
Even more on Granny's Intentions
Johnny Duhan in 'Musicians, Singers, Comedians, etc.' file at Limerick City Library, Ireland
Granny's Intentions in 'Music, pop, etc.' file at Limerick City Library, Ireland
Podcast

1950 births
Living people
Musicians from Limerick (city)
Musicians from County Galway